The 1999 Syracuse Orangemen football team represented Syracuse University during the 1999 NCAA Division I-A football season. The Orange were coached by Paul Pasqualoni and played their home games at the Carrier Dome in Syracuse, New York.

Schedule

Roster

References

Syracuse
Syracuse Orange football seasons
Syracuse Orangemen football